Clifton High School (CHS) is a public high school located in Clifton, Texas (United States) and classified as a 3A school by the UIL. It is part of the Clifton Independent School District located in southern Bosque County. In 2015, the school was rated "Met Standard" by the Texas Education Agency.

Academics
In 2010, CHS students passed the TAKS at rates above that of the state average in all subjects, having 100% passing rates in Grade 11 Social Studies and Grade 11 English Language Arts.

CHS offers extensive dual credit (dual enrollment) course opportunities. Dual credit courses are college courses which provide both high school and college credit.  At CHS, these courses are typically offered from University of Texas Permian Basin  or Hill College.

Athletics

The Clifton Cubs and Lady Cubs compete in the following sports:

Baseball
Basketball
Cross Country
Football
Golf
Powerlifting
Softball
Tennis
Track and Field
Volleyball

The CHS athletic program is currently under the leadership of athletic director and head football coach, Brent Finney. The school's teams compete in state championship series tournaments sponsored by the UIL.

UIL District Alignment (2022-2023)
For football, CHS competes in Conference 3A, Division II, Region 4, District 13:
 Clifton High School
 Buffalo High School (Texas)]]
 Elkhart High School (Texas)]]
 Lexington High School
 [[Florence High School (Texas)
 [[Rogers High School (Texas)

For other sports, CHS competes in Conference 3A, Region 3, District 17:
 Clifton High School
 Grandview High School
 Harmony School of Innovation-Waco
 Keene High School
 Maypearl High School
 West High School
 Whitney High School

State Finalist
Football  - 
1967(1A)
https://realignment.uiltexas.org/alignments/2020/3AVB2020.pdf

In 1995, the women's volleyball team lost to Jewett Leon (Scores: 15-9; 15-7) in the conference 2A state semi-finals.

Activities
CHS offers a variety of extracurricular activities and promotes student involvement.  These activities include:
 UIL Academic Competitions
 Theater (One Act Play)
 Journalism
 Speech
 Debate
 Science
 Math
 English/Literature
 National Honor Society
 L.I.F.E. (Christian Student Organization)
 Student Council
 FFA
 Cheerleading
 Interact (Rotary International)
 Robotics Team
 BEST Robotics
 FIRST Lego League

Traditions
 After winning home football games, each player on the Clifton High School football team takes a turn ringing the victory bell on the north side of Cub Stadium.
 The victory bell on the north side of Cub Stadium is rung by each graduating senior immediately after the graduation ceremony.
 The Clifton High School Fight Song is to the tune of the Notre Dame Victory March. The CHS Fight Song is played frequently at football games, pep-rallies and graduation. Clifton High School does not have words for the CHS Fight Song.
 The Clifton High School Song is an original composition by a Clifton High School student. This song is a slow ballad. With the accompaniment of the CHS band, it is typically sung at all football games and pep-rallies, as well as graduation.

Clifton High School Song

Clifton High School we love you
And your glory we shall sing;
Memories of you we will cherish
And praises to you we will bring

Forever you banner we'll wave
With pride we'll hold it high;
We stand by your side Clifton High School
We'll laud your name to the sky

And in the books of fame
In gold we'll write your name;
We love you, C.H.S.

 The Clifton High School yearbook is called "The Old Mill," named after a historic mill built in Clifton on the Bosque River after the American Civil War.

Notable alumni
Bobby Joe Conrad - former NFL player
Bernie Erickson - former NFL player
Ray Sadler - former Major League Baseball player
Josh Grelle - voice actor

References

External links
 Clifton ISD

Schools in Bosque County, Texas
Public high schools in Texas